Dynamo Stadion is a multi-use stadium in Bishkek, Kyrgyzstan.  It is currently used mostly for association football matches and serves as the home stadium for FC Alga Bishkek of the Kyrgyzstan League.  It used to host Sher-Ak-Dan Bishkek as well. The stadium has a capacity of 10,000 people.

External links
Stadium information

Football venues in Kyrgyzstan